Shakedown! The Texas Tapes Revisited is a Grammy nominated compilation of the work of Bobby Fuller and his recording band in El Paso, Texas before signing to Bob Keane's Del-Fi Records 1964. The two CDs compile Fuller's hit local singles, and a wealth of outtakes and other recordings over its 50 tracks.

Track listing

Personnel
Bobby Fuller - vocals, guitar
Randy Fuller - backing vocals, bass
Mike Ciccarelli - backing vocals, guitar
Tex Reed - backing vocals, guitar
Sonny Fletchter - backing vocals, guitar
Jerry Miller - backing vocals, guitar
Billy Webb - backing vocals, guitar
Jim Reese - backing vocals, guitar
Dalton Powell - drums
Freddy Paz - drums
Jimmy Wagnon - drums
DeWayne Quirico - drums on tracks 7, 8, 19, and 21 on Disc 2

References

The Bobby Fuller Four albums